The Indian National Physics Olympiad (INPhO in short) is the second stage of the five-stage Olympiad programme for Physics in India. It ultimately leads to the selection in the International Physics Olympiad.

INPhO is conducted on the last Sunday of January , every year, by the Homi Bhabha Centre for Science Education. School students (usually of standards 11 and 12 albeit special cases prevail) first need to qualify the National Standard Examination in Physics (NSEP) held on the last (or second last) Sunday of November of the preceding year. Among over 40,000 students appearing for the examination at almost 1400 centres across India, around 300 to 400 students are selected for INPhO based on their scores and also based on regional quotas for the states from which they appear. Different state-wise cut-offs exist for selection to INPhO. INPhO serves as a means to select students for OCSC (Orientation Cum Selection Camp) in Physics, as well as to represent India in the Asian Physics Olympiad (APhO).

Eligibility

NSEP 
The examination is intended for students in 9th,10th and primarily, the 11th and 12th standard. Students who have passed Class 12 are not eligible to enrol for NSEP. Besides, they must satisfy the age criteria for IPhO (Less than 20 years of age on June 30th of the year of the respective IPhO). At any stage if the student is found to be not eligible for the exam, he/she may be disqualified from the program. During registration, a one time fee of ₹150, or $15 for overseas candidates must be paid. No TA/DA is provided. Also, candidates who have represented India in the or the Asian Physics Olympiad (APhO) on a previous occasion need not appear for the NSEP. Such candidates, however need to seek permission from the national coordinator to directly write the INPhO.

INPhO 
Students must satisfy appropriate eligibility criteria in NSEP. They must score more than 50% of the average of the top ten scores. This is the Minimum Admissible Score (MAS in short). If they score more than 80% of the above-mentioned average, they're selected for INPhO.This score is the Merit Index (MI). After selection of these students, more are selected from below the MI, but above the MAS, till the quota of seats allowed to their respective state is filled, completely, or to as large an extent as possible.

OCSC Physics 
The top 35 students, based solely on their INPhO scores, are selected to attend the Orientation cum Selection camp (OCSC).

APhO 
Typically, marks of several students are calculated by adding 40% of the NSEP score, as a percentage of the maximal marks attainable in the examination (generally 240) to 60% of the INPhO score, as a percentage of the maximal marks attainable (varies from year to year). A list of the top 50 students is hence prepared, and the top 8, who are willing to appear for APhO, are selected. It may be noted, however, that only 5 students were registered for APhO in 2017 and 2018.

PDC (Pre-Departure Training Camp) 
The student must clear OCSC Physics, i.e., be amongst the 5 who have scored the highest total marks in OCSC.

Syllabus and Format

NSEP 
The National Standard Examination in Physics or NSEP is an examination in 
physics for higher secondary school students, usually conducted on the last/second last Sunday of November. Organized by the Indian Association of Physics Teachers, NSEP is the first stage of selection of students in the International Physics Olympiad. Before 2014-15, The NSEP comprised both multiple choice questions and subjective questions. Due to the large volume of participating students, all questions were not checked for all candidates; subjective questions were checked for only those candidates scoring above a certain minimum in the multiple choice questions. Multiple choice questions carried about 60% of the total weightage and were the crucial determinant for selection to the next stage.
The present format (from 2014-15 onwards) is composed entirely of 70 multiple-choice questions. 60 of these have only one option correct and, 10, more than one. 3 marks are awarded for the solving each of the first 60 correctly and 1 mark deducted for each mistake there. For the last 10 (more than one option correct), 6 marks are awarded for each correct answer. However, there is no negative marking in this case. The top few (300-450) students from this examination are selected to sit for the Indian National Physics Olympiad. The NSEP is carried out every year since 1987 in English, Hindi & a few other Indian languages. The syllabus is not fixed, but roughly equivalent to CBSE class 11 and 12 physics syllabus. NSEP is speed based examination in which the speed of students is tested as they need to solve 70 problems in 2 hours. 
.

INPhO 
INPhO consists of, usually, about 6 subjective problems, which the students must solve in 3 hours. Use of a non-programmable scientific calculator is usually allowed, as long as it has less than 4 lines in its display, no graphing feature and no CAS-like functionality. The total marks vary each year. Earlier, the syllabus matched that of IPhO, but now, it is broadly equivalent to the syllabus of NSEP. It was changed for the convenience of students studying for the IIT JEE and the physics olympiad, at the same time.

APhO Training Camp 
The selected team of 8 students, for APhO, must attend a 5 day long training camp prior to APhO, where topics such as relativity and thermodynamics, absent/not stressed upon in most Indian schools, are covered. The team also undergoes training in experiments. The syllabus is equivalent to the syllabus of IPhO (Same as that of APhO).

OCSC Physics 
The top 35 students, based solely on their INPhO scores are selected to attend the Orientation cum Selection camp (OCSC), a 14-day long camp held at HBCSE, Mumbai. However, in 2014-15, HBCSE being busy in the organisation of IPhO 2015, India, OCSC was organised by IAPT, and held in New Delhi.Dates are usually from the end of May to the start of June. The team for the International Physics Olympiad is selected based on a rigorous procedure of theory and practical examinations (Normally, 3 each) at OCSC Physics.60% (240 marks) weightage is given to the theory exam, and 40% (160 marks) to the practical one, akin to that at the International Physics Olympiad. The difficulty level is similar to that found in the international olympiad. Topics such as relativity and thermodynamics, absent/not stressed upon in most Indian schools are covered. The syllabus is equivalent to that of IPhO.

PDC Physics 
A PDC (Pre-Departure training camp for physics) is held to (rigorously) train the five-student team, for 10–14 days, prior to IPhO, in experiment and theory.

Awards and incentives  
Qualification for OCSC assures students of direct entry into the B.Sc Physics programme at the Chennai Mathematical Institute. Besides,

1.Awards such as "Best in Experiment" and "Best Solution (Theory)" are awarded in the OCSC, with cash prizes.

2.All INPhO qualifiers get gold medals, books and certificates

3. Those sitting for NSEP may get National Top 1%, State Top 1% or Centre Top 10% certificates, the first accompanied with book prizes

4. The selected Indian team members get 8000 Rupees in form of books and cash.

See also 
 International Physics Olympiad
 Asian Physics Olympiad
 Indian Association of Physics Teachers
 Homi Bhabha Centre For Science Education
 International Science Olympiad
 Junior Science Talent Search Examination

References

External links
 Indian Association Of Physics Teachers website, with further details about NSEP. 
 Homi Bhabha Centre For Science Education, the nodal centre for organisation of many science olympiads in India.  * Information about India at the Science Olympiads

Physics Olympiads in India